Clive Watson (12 April 1924 – 5 January 1979) was  a former Australian rules footballer who played with Richmond in the Victorian Football League (VFL).

Notes

External links 
		

1924 births
1979 deaths
Australian rules footballers from Victoria (Australia)
Richmond Football Club players